Esla or ESLA can refer to:

 Əşlə, Azerbaijani municipality
 Esla river, Spain
 Enterprise South Liverpool Academy, located in Liverpool, England